Feodora of Hohenlohe-Langenburg (Feodora Victoria Adelheid; 7 July 1839 – 10 February 1872) was a daughter of Ernst I, Prince of Hohenlohe-Langenburg and Princess Feodora of Leiningen. She married Georg of Saxe-Meiningen and was Duchess of Saxe-Meiningen from his accession as Duke Georg II on 20 September 1866 until her death in 1872.

Family
Feodora was the youngest of six children. Her mother was an older half-sister to Queen Victoria, thus making the younger Feodora a niece of the Queen. Her siblings included Prince Victor of Hohenlohe-Langenburg and Adelheid, Duchess of Schleswig-Holstein.

Duchess consort of Saxe-Meiningen 
Feodora met her future husband (and second cousin) while he was on his way to Italy. He had been recently widowed, his first wife having been Charlotte Frederica of Prussia. Despite this recent loss, Georg went on a search to provide a mother for his two young children. Feodora and Georg became engaged almost at once. On 23 October 1858, they married at Langenburg. They had three sons.

Their marriage was unhappy however. Georg had never become reconciled to Charlotte's death and Feodora was not temperamentally suited for the life she was expected to lead. She had no intellectual or artistic attainments and no apparent interest in developing any. Despite this fact, Georg attempted to educate her. He was a great lover of the arts, especially theatre. Her mother approved, stating it was "very sensible of him indeed to arrange for his bride to be much occupied with lessons, to take drawing lessons, and to hear lectures on history". He soon realised however that she would never be as witty and clever as Charlotte. After the death of their third son, Feodora stayed away from Meiningen for as much time as decently possible. In 1866, he succeeded as Duke of Saxe-Meiningen, making her the first lady of the realm.

Feodora contracted scarlet fever in January 1872, and died the following month. Despite the many differences between them, Georg had remained fond of her; when she became sick, he was genuinely distraught and sent telegrams to her parents twice daily. In the following year, Georg remarried again, morganatically to Ellen Franz, a former actress.

Children 
 Prince Ernst Bernhard of Saxe-Meiningen (27 September 1859 – 29 December 1941) he married Katharina Jensen on 20 September 1892. They had six children.

 Prince Frederick Johann of Saxe-Meiningen (12 October 1861 – 23 August 1914) he married Countess Adelaide of Lippe-Biesterfeld on 24 April 1889. They had six children.

 Prince Viktor of Saxe-Meiningen (14 May 1865 – 17 May 1865) died two days old.

Ancestry

References

Works cited

External links
 

1839 births
1872 deaths
Nobility from Stuttgart
House of Hohenlohe-Langenburg
House of Saxe-Meiningen
Duchesses of Saxe-Meiningen
Princesses of Hohenlohe-Langenburg